Excellent SME is an international project, aiming to establish a white list of small and medium enterprises (SME) by means of certification system. The project brings emphasis on web site certification.

Principles 

The project is built on three pillars:
 institution of trust, preferably a chamber of commerce, assuming the role of issuer
 credit rating data provided by credit rating agency
 technology that enables easy verification of certificate validity and consequently prevents dilution of trust caused by forgery.

Criteria 

The Excellent SME certificate can be obtained by companies meeting basic criteria:
 small or medium enterprise (usually up to 250 employees, other measures may apply in different countries)
 minimum turnover of 25000 €
 credit score at least 6 (out of 10), BBB in some credit scoring systems.

The certificate is issued for period of 1 year. However the credit score is under permanent monitoring and the certificate is revoked prematurely if the holder's credit score drops below 6.

History 
Project was initiated in 2012 in Slovenia by partners Chamber of Commerce and Industry of Slovenia, credit rating agency  and technology provider CONNET d.o.o. with its 

Serbia joined the project the same year. In 2013 Macedonia and Romania followed. In 2014 Bulgaria joined.

References

Sources

External links 

 

Small business
Internet security
Consumer protection